SKCF Sevastopol was a Soviet football team from Sevastopol, Russian SFSR, later Ukrainian SSR. The club represented sports club of the Black Sea Fleet and originally was called as the Fleet Officers Club, DOF.

History
The football team first appeared before the World War II in the 1939 Russian Cup (Russian SFSR) where they lost to Sudostroitel Sevastopol.

After the war the team was revived in 1949 and was active until 1971. In 1949–1952 it played in the Russian football championship among KFK. In 1953 due to the death of Joseph Stalin, almost all military-based sports organization were withdrawn from competitions including SKCF. In 1954 the Crimean Oblast was transferred from the Russian SFSR to the Ukrainian SSR and teams of SKCF started to play more often with Ukrainian teams.

In 1963 the club was relegated and played in an amateur competition. In 1964 to the Master competition was promoted another club from Sevastopol Chaika Sevastopol that played in the Class B for the next three seasons until also was relegated. In 1968 SKCF managed to return, but had a terrible season and was relegated again. After another poor performance at amateur level the club folded. Since 1971 the Fleet team active competition record is discontinued.

Managers
 1954 Aleksandr Kvasnikov
 1955 Viktor Chistokhvalov
 1957 Valentin Artemyev
 1961 Georgiy Sudakov
 1962 Aleksei Sokolov
 1963–1964 Valentin Tugarin
 1965 Vladimir Nikanorov
 1967 Georgiy Sudakov
 1968 Mikhail Yermolayev

League and cup history (Soviet Union)
Sources:
{|class="wikitable"
|-bgcolor="#efefef"
! Season
! Div.
! Pos.
! Pl.
! W
! D
! L
! GS
! GA
! P
!Domestic Cup
!colspan=2|Europe
!Notes
|- bgcolor=LightCyan
|align=center|1954
|align=center|2nd Class B Gr. 3
|align=center|9/12
|align=center|22
|align=center|5
|align=center|8
|align=center|9
|align=center|19
|align=center|31
|align=center|18
|align=center| finals
|align=center|
|align=center|
|align=center|
|- bgcolor=LightCyan
|align=center|1955
|align=center|2nd Class B Gr. 1
|align=center|15/16
|align=center|30
|align=center|7
|align=center|6
|align=center|17
|align=center|25
|align=center|61
|align=center|20
|align=center|Zone 3,  finals
|align=center|
|align=center|
|align=center bgcolor=pink|Relegated
|- bgcolor=PowderBlue
|align=center|1956
|align=center|3rd Championship of the Ukrainian SSR Gr. 6
|align=center bgcolor=gold|1/8
|align=center|14
|align=center|12
|align=center|1
|align=center|1
|align=center|43
|align=center|8
|align=center|25
|align=center|
|align=center|
|align=center|
|align=center bgcolor=lightgreen|Final (4th), promoted
|- bgcolor=LightCyan
|align=center|1957
|align=center|2nd Class B Gr. 1
|align=center|9/18
|align=center|34
|align=center|15
|align=center|5
|align=center|14
|align=center|72
|align=center|49
|align=center|35
|align=center|Zone 1, final
|align=center|
|align=center|
|align=center|
|- bgcolor=LightCyan
|align=center|1958
|align=center|2nd Class B Gr. 2
|align=center bgcolor=gold|1/16
|align=center|30
|align=center|16
|align=center|9
|align=center|5
|align=center|52
|align=center|23
|align=center|41
|align=center|Zone 2,  finals
|align=center|
|align=center|
|align=center|Final (3rd)
|- bgcolor=LightCyan
|align=center|1959
|align=center|2nd Class B Gr. 4
|align=center|10/15
|align=center|28
|align=center|9
|align=center|5
|align=center|14
|align=center|31
|align=center|46
|align=center|23
|align=center|
|align=center|
|align=center|
|align=center|
|- bgcolor=LightCyan
|align=center|1960
|align=center|2nd Class B, Ukrainian SSR Gr. 2
|align=center|6/19
|align=center|36
|align=center|15
|align=center|9
|align=center|12
|align=center|49
|align=center|34
|align=center|39
|align=center|Zone 4,  finals
|align=center|
|align=center|
|align=center|
|- bgcolor=LightCyan
|align=center|1961
|align=center|2nd Class B, Ukrainian SSR Gr. 2
|align=center|8/19
|align=center|36
|align=center|12
|align=center|13
|align=center|11
|align=center|56
|align=center|46
|align=center|37
|align=center| finals
|align=center|
|align=center|
|align=center|
|- bgcolor=LightCyan
|align=center|1962
|align=center|2nd Class B, Ukrainian SSR Gr. 3
|align=center|8/13
|align=center|24
|align=center|7
|align=center|9
|align=center|8
|align=center|29
|align=center|27
|align=center|23
|align=center|Zone Ukrainian SSR,  finals
|align=center|
|align=center|
|align=center bgcolor=brick|Final stage, Places 18–28 (24th); reorganization of competitions
|- bgcolor=PowderBlue
|align=center|1963
|align=center|3rd Class B, Ukrainian SSR Gr. 2
|align=center|12/20
|align=center|38
|align=center|15
|align=center|8
|align=center|15
|align=center|48
|align=center|32
|align=center|38
|align=center|Zone 2 Ukrainian SSR, final
|align=center|
|align=center|
|align=center|
|- bgcolor=PowderBlue
|align=center|1964
|align=center|3rd Class B, Ukrainian SSR Gr. 3
|align=center|4/16
|align=center|30
|align=center|14
|align=center|6
|align=center|10
|align=center|45
|align=center|28
|align=center|34
|align=center| finals
|align=center|
|align=center|
|align=center|Final stage, Places 7–12 (11th)
|- bgcolor=PowderBlue
|align=center|1965
|align=center|3rd Class B, Ukrainian SSR Gr. 3
|align=center|4/17
|align=center|32
|align=center|15
|align=center|8
|align=center|9
|align=center|54
|align=center|34
|align=center|38
|align=center|Zone 3 Ukrainian SSR,  finals
|align=center|
|align=center|
|align=center|Final stage, Places 7–12 (11th)
|- bgcolor=PowderBlue
|align=center|1966
|align=center|3rd Class B, Ukrainian SSR Gr. 1
|align=center bgcolor=tan|3/20
|align=center|38
|align=center|18
|align=center|12
|align=center|8
|align=center|57
|align=center|34
|align=center|48
|align=center|
|align=center|
|align=center|
|align=center|Final stage, Places 5–6 (5th)
|- bgcolor=PowderBlue
|align=center|1967
|align=center|3rd Class B, Ukrainian SSR Gr. 1
|align=center|4/21
|align=center|40
|align=center|19
|align=center|10
|align=center|11
|align=center|41
|align=center|33
|align=center|48
|align=center|Zone 1 Ukrainian SSR,  finals
|align=center|
|align=center|
|align=center bgcolor=lightgreen|Promoted
|- bgcolor=LightCyan
|align=center|1968
|align=center|2nd Class A Second Group SubGr. 2
|align=center|21/21
|align=center|40
|align=center|5
|align=center|11
|align=center|24
|align=center|16
|align=center|57
|align=center|21
|align=center| finals
|align=center|
|align=center|
|align=center bgcolor=pink|Ukrainian Relegation Tournament (6th, relegated)
|- bgcolor=PowderBlue
|align=center|1969
|align=center|3rd Class B, Ukrainian SSR Gr. 2
|align=center|8/21
|align=center|40
|align=center|12
|align=center|17
|align=center|11
|align=center|33
|align=center|28
|align=center|41
|align=center|
|align=center|
|align=center|
|align=center bgcolor=brick|Reorganization of competitions
|- align=center bgcolor=SteelBlue
|align=center|1970
|align=center|4th Class B, Ukrainian SSR Gr. 2
|align=center|14/14
|align=center|26
|align=center|6
|align=center|7
|align=center|13
|align=center|21
|align=center|34
|align=center|19
|align=center|
|align=center|
|align=center|
|align=center bgcolor=brick|Final stage, Places 15–27 (23rd); reorganization of competitions
|}

References

Defunct football clubs in Sevastopol
1939 establishments in the Soviet Union
1971 disestablishments in the Soviet Union
Association football clubs established in 1939
Association football clubs disestablished in 1971
Football clubs in the Ukrainian Soviet Socialist Republic
Defunct football clubs in the Soviet Union
Armed Forces sports society
Military association football clubs in Ukraine